Cédric Mandembo (born 4 April 1984 in Kinshasa, DR Congo) is a DR Congolese judoka. He competed at the 2012 Summer Olympics in the +100 kg event but lost to eventual silver medalist Alexander Mikhaylin in the first round.
Mandembo and three other members of the DR Congo delegation to the London Olympics were reported missing on 13 August 2012, the day after the closing ceremony.

References 

1994 births
Living people
Democratic Republic of the Congo male judoka
Olympic judoka of the Democratic Republic of the Congo
Judoka at the 2012 Summer Olympics
Sportspeople from Kinshasa
21st-century Democratic Republic of the Congo people